The 2019–20 Auburn Tigers men's basketball team represented Auburn University during the 2019–20 NCAA Division I men's basketball season as a member of the Southeastern Conference. The team's head coach was Bruce Pearl in his sixth season at Auburn. The team played their home games at Auburn Arena in Auburn, Alabama. They finished the season 25–6, 12–6 in SEC play to finish in a tie for second place. They were set to be the No. 2 seed in the SEC tournament with a bye to the quarterfinals. However, the SEC Tournament and all other postseason tournaments were cancelled amid the COVID-19 pandemic.

Previous season
The Tigers finished the 2018–19 season 30–10, 11–7 in SEC play. As the No. 5 seed in the SEC tournament, the Tigers defeated Missouri, South Carolina, Florida, and Tennessee to win the tournament championship. It was Auburn's second SEC Tournament championship and first since 1985. The Tigers received the conference's automatic bid to the NCAA tournament as the No. 5 seed in the Midwest Region. There, they defeated New Mexico State and Kansas to advance to the team first Sweet Sixteen since 2003. In the Sweet Sixteen, they defeated No. 1-seeded North Carolina to advance to the Elite Eight. There they defeated No. 2 seed Kentucky to advance to the program's first Final Four. In the Final Four, they suffered a controversial loss to eventual national champion Virginia.

Offseason

Departures
Auburn lost seniors Cole Blackstock, Bryce Brown, Malik Dunbar, and Horace Spencer to graduation. In addition, Jared Harper and Chuma Okeke declared for the NBA draft. The Orlando Magic picked Okeke as the 16th draft choice, making him the first Auburn player to be drafted since 2001. Harper signed with the Phoenix Suns, Brown with the Sacramento Kings, and Dunbar with the Golden State Warriors. Spencer signed with Argentine club Atenas de Cordoba.

2019 recruiting class

2020 Recruiting class

Preseason

SEC media poll
The SEC media poll was released on October 15, 2019.

Roster

Schedule and results

|-
! colspan=9 style=| Exhibition

|-
!colspan=9 style=|Regular season

|-
!colspan=9 style=| SEC Tournament
|- style="background:#bbbbbb"
| style="text-align:center"|March 13, 20206:00 pm, SECN
| style="text-align:center"| (2) No. 20
| vs. Quarterfinals
| colspan=5 rowspan=1 style="text-align:center"|Cancelled due to the COVID-19 pandemic
| style="text-align:center"|Bridgestone ArenaNashville, TN
|-

Rankings

*AP does not release post-NCAA Tournament rankings

Awards and honors

Samir Doughty 

 Coaches' First Team All-SEC
 AP Second Team All-SEC

Isaac Okoro 

 Coaches' Second Team All-SEC
 Coaches' SEC All-Freshman Team
 Coaches' SEC All-Defensive Team

Austin Wiley
Preseason Coaches' Second Team All-SEC
Legends Classic MVP

References 

Auburn
Auburn Tigers men's basketball seasons
Auburn Tigers men's basketball
Auburn Tigers men's basketball